"Chillin'" is a song by French house duo Modjo, written and performed by producer Romain Tranchart and vocalist Yann Destagnol. It was released as the second single from the duo's self-titled debut studio album (2001). The song features samples from "Le Freak" by Chic, for which Nile Rodgers and Bernard Edwards are also credited as songwriters. Released on 2 April 2001, the song reached number three in Finland and Hungary, number four in Portugal and Spain, number 10 in Switzerland, and number 12 in the United Kingdom.

Track listings

 French CD single
 "Chillin'" (radio edit) – 3:48
 "Chillin'" (original extended) – 5:07

 UK CD single
 "Chillin'" (original extended) – 5:07
 "Chillin' Con Carne" (Por Favor mix by We In Music vs. the Buffalo Bunch) – 5:52
 "Lady (Hear Me Tonight)" (Choo Choo's original recipe) – 7:41
 "Chillin'" (video)

 UK 12-inch single
A1. "Chillin'" (original extended) – 5:07
A2. "Chillin' Con Carne" (Por Favor mix by We In Music vs. the Buffalo Bunch) – 5:52
B1. "The Art of Chillin'" (by Hervé Bordes) – 4:03

 UK cassette single
A1. "Chillin'" (radio edit) – 3:48
A2. "Chillin'" (original extended) – 5:07
B1. "Lady (Hear Me Tonight)" (Choo Choo's original recipe) – 7:41

 Australian CD single
 "Chillin'" (radio edit) – 3:48
 "Chillin'" (original extended) – 5:07
 "Chillin' Con Carne" (Por Favor mix by We In Music vs. the Buffalo Bunch) – 5:52
 "The Art of Chillin'" (by Hervé Bordes) – 4:03
 "Lady (Hear Me Tonight)" (acoustic) – 3:13

 US maxi-CD single
 "Chillin'" (original extended) – 5:07
 "Chillin' Con Carne" (Por Favor mix by We In Music vs. the Buffalo Bunch) – 5:53
 "Chillin'" (Modjo Dyrt remix) – 7:39
 "Chillin'" (live) – 6:16
 "Chillin'" (music video) – 3:48

 US 12-inch single
A1. "Chillin'" (original extended) – 5:07
A2. "The Art of Chillin'" (by Hervé Bordes) – 4:03
B1. "Chillin' Con Carne" (Por Favor mix by We In Music vs. the Buffalo Bunch) – 5:53
B2. "Chillin'" (original mix) – 3:48

Charts

Weekly charts

Year-end charts

References

2001 singles
2001 songs
Barclay (record label) singles
MCA Records singles
Modjo songs
Songs written by Bernard Edwards
Songs written by Nile Rodgers